Kodak is an unincorporated community and a neighborhood of Sevierville in Sevier County, Tennessee, United States. It is located along State Highway 139 and State Highway 66, and just south of I-40 and Knoxville, Tennessee.

Kodak is included in Sevierville's urban growth boundary for future annexation.

History
Kodak was named in 1892 when the local postmaster, Harvey N. Underwood, learned of the new "Kodak" brand of camera. Underwood decided that this was a name that was easy to remember and spell, hence he sought permission from the founder of Eastman Kodak, George Eastman, to use this name for his village and its post office. Eastman granted this permission.
In 1989, a new post office building was constructed on Highway 66.

A large portion of Kodak along State Highway 66 and I-40 exit 407 has been annexed into the City of Sevierville since the 1990s.

The Treaty of Dumplin Creek
The Treaty of Dumplin Creek was signed at Maj. Hugh Henry's fort, in the area that would become Kodak, on June 10, 1785, between the proposed, never-recognized State of Franklin and the Cherokee tribe of Native Americans. The precise location of the treaty signing is not known and has been subject of archaeological investigation. According to a state historical marker placed at one site thought to be the location of the signing, commissioners involved in the treaty from the State of Franklin were John Sevier (namesake of the county in which Kodak sits), Alexander Outlaw and Daniel Kennedy. The marker identifies the Cherokee signers as "the King of the Cherokee, Ancoo of Chota, Abraham of Chilhowee, The Sturgeon of Tallassee, the Bard of the Valley Towns and some thirty others." The treaty's effect was to open the East Tennessee counties of Blount, Hamblen, Jefferson, Knox and Sevier to white settlers and homesteaders without Native resistance. The historical marker incorrectly identifies this as the only treaty made by the State of Franklin, though there was at least one other (the Treaty of Coyatee, also with the Cherokee).

Retail
Exit 407 on Interstate 40 has many restaurants and several stores.
Bass Pro Shops is located right off the exit. Other stores in Kodak include Food City, Dollar General, Family Dollar and various local shops.

Education
Schools in Kodak are a part of Sevier County Schools.
Northview Primary School – grades K–3
Northview Intermediate School – grades 4–6
Northview Academy – grades 7–12

Points of interest
 Smokies Stadium
 Seven Islands State Birding Park
 Sevier County Public Library System - Kodak Branch Library
Smoky Mountain Gateway - short term rental

References

Unincorporated communities in Sevier County, Tennessee
Unincorporated communities in Tennessee
Kodak